Lonkar is a surname. Notable people with the surname include:

Prateeksha Lonkar (born 1968), Indian Marathi film and television actress
Suryakant Lonkar, Indian politician
Tanvi Ganesh Lonkar (born 1995), Indian film and television actress